The Chris Griffis Memorial Test is a two-day test event for Road to Indy racing series. The testing is conducted after the regular season. The test is used by teams to test new drivers as well as for the organization to test new cars for the following season.

Chris Griffis
Chris Griffis (11 May 196612 September 2011) was a former teammanager for Schmidt Peterson Motorsports. Griffis started his career at Patrick Racing, working with Gordon Johncock, Emerson Fittipaldi among others. In 1990, Griffis joined Chip Ganassi Racing before moving to Bernstein Racing in 1993 and later joining Panther Racing in 2002. At Panther Racing, Griffis was the crew chief of Mark Taylor winning the 2003 Indy Lights title.

Griffis collapsed and died after a basketball game. He was survived by his wife Mari and daughters (Clair and Sophia). Griffis was buried in Akron, Indiana.

Fastest times

Track

Drivers who tested but not raced
The below table contains drivers who tested during the Chris Griffis Memorial Test in Indy Lights, USF Pro 2000 or USF2000 but not competed in any of the classes.

References

U.S. F2000 National Championship
Indy Lights
Indy Pro 2000 Championship